Laurence O'Brien (1792 – April 28, 1870) was an Irish-born merchant and politician in Newfoundland. He represented St. John's in the Newfoundland and Labrador House of Assembly from 1841 to 1850 as a Liberal.

He was born in Clashmore, County Waterford and came to Newfoundland sometime between 1808 and 1810, later establishing himself in St. John's the company of Lawrence O'Brien and Company, a wholesale and retail trading company. O'Brien owned a wharf, warehouses and a retail store, and was also the owner of several trading ships. He was also involved in the seal fishery. He was involved in the formation of the Bank of Newfoundland and was a promoter of the Union Bank. In 1832, he married Margaret Manning. He was first elected to the Newfoundland assembly in an 1840 by-election held after Patrick Morris was named to the colony's Council. In 1843, O'Brien was named to the Executive Council. He resigned his seat in the assembly in 1850 after he was named to the Legislative Council. O'Brien was named president for the Legislative Council and Executive Council in 1855. He served as colonial administrator for Newfoundland in 1863. O'Brien died near St. John's in 1870.

References 

Members of the Newfoundland and Labrador House of Assembly
1792 births
1870 deaths
Irish emigrants to pre-Confederation Newfoundland
Members of the Legislative Council of Newfoundland
Members of the Executive Council of Newfoundland and Labrador
Newfoundland Colony people